Mike Fuailefau (born March 20, 1992) is a Canadian rugby union player, in the sevens discipline. Fuailefau is of Samoan heritage, as his father is from there.

Career
Fuailefau was part of Canada's 2014 Commonwealth Games and 2018 Commonwealth Games, with both teams getting knocked out in the group stage.

Fuailefau won gold as part of Canada's team at the 2015 Pan American Games in Toronto.

In June 2021, Fuailefau was named to Canada's 2020 Olympic team.

References

1992 births
Living people
Rugby sevens players at the 2014 Commonwealth Games
Rugby sevens players at the 2018 Commonwealth Games
Commonwealth Games rugby sevens players of Canada
Canada international rugby sevens players
Rugby sevens players at the 2015 Pan American Games
Pan American Games gold medalists for Canada
Pan American Games medalists in rugby sevens
Medalists at the 2015 Pan American Games
Canadian people of Samoan descent
Rugby sevens players at the 2020 Summer Olympics
Olympic rugby sevens players of Canada